Eleven Chorale Preludes, Op. 122, is a collection of works for organ by Johannes Brahms, written in 1896 at the end of the composer's life and published posthumously in 1902. They are based on verses of nine Lutheran chorales, two of them set twice, and are relatively short:

 Mein Jesu, der du mich in E minor
 Herzliebster Jesu, was hast du verbrochen in G minor
 O Welt, ich muß dich lassen (O World, I Must Leave You) in F major
 Herzlich tut mich erfreuen in D major
 Schmücke dich, o liebe Seele in E major
 O wie selig seid ihr doch, ihr Frommen in D minor 
 O Gott, du frommer Gott in A minor
 Es ist ein Ros’ entsprungen in F major
 Herzlich tut mich verlangen (Heartily Do I Request) in A minor
 Herzlich tut mich verlangen (second setting) in A minor
 O Welt, ich muß dich lassen (second setting) in F major

Transcriptions

Preludes 4, 5, and 8–11 were transcribed for solo piano by Ferruccio Busoni in 1902 as BV B 50. These transcriptions have been recorded by Paul Jacobs, Wolf Harden, Lydia Artymiw, and Igor Levit.

References

External links

 , Robert Pecksmith, 1872 Ladegast organ of St. Jakob, Köthen
 , Robert Pecksmith, 1879 Sauer organ of Sankt-Gertraud-Kirche, Frankfurt (Oder)

Compositions by Johannes Brahms
1896 compositions
Compositions for organ
Preludes (music)
Brahms